Pietà is a tempera on wood painting by Filippo Lippi, executed c. 1430–1435, in the Museo Horne, Florence.

History
The work, a pace, is mentioned at the end of the 19th century as an work by Masaccio. It was purchased at the beginning of the 10th century by Herbert Horne and shortly afterwards Pietro Toesca was the first to recognize it as an work of Filippo Lippi, in an unpublished attribution of 1921. It was also confirmed during the exhibition Lorenzo the Magnificent and the Arts (Collobi-Ragghianti, 1949) and finally in the catalog of the exhibition The Age of Masaccio (Florence, 1990). Dating has always represented a difficult problem: some attribute the work to a youthful phase of Lippi, still influenced by Masaccio, others to the years of 1435–1440, based on the refinement of some details such as the description of the sarcophagus and the treatment of Christ's hair.

Description and style
The iconography of Christ is traditional, depicted as he rises from the tomb with his arms outstretched and showing the signs of the  Passion. The naturalistic notations of the body reveal the hand of a master, as well as the strong chiaroscuro that shapes the musculature. The background is dark, with the cross behind Christ.

References

1430s paintings
Paintings by Filippo Lippi
Paintings in the collection of the Museo Horne